The Laziest Men on Mars was an American techno band known for their successful gabber song "Invasion of the Gabber Robots" which remixed some of the Zero Wing video game music by Tatsuya Uemura, which became background music to the popular "All your base are belong to us" Flash animation. Their song "Invasion of the Gabber Robots" was featured prominently on Mp3.com. Their name is taken from a line in the Season 3 episode of Mystery Science Theater 3000 riffing on the B-movie Santa Claus Conquers The Martians, which the band samples in several of their songs ("Droppo, you are the laziest man on mars"). The identity of only one of the group's members has been discovered: DJ Jeffrey Ray Roberts (1977–2011) of Kansas City, Missouri, who created the track "Invasion of the Gabber Robots" in late 2000. He was an IT programmer and a part-time deejay.

The remaining members' identities, if any, remain unknown.

Track listing
While the band released no official albums, a number of songs were available on MP3.com. In order, they were:

Invasion of the Gabber Robots (3:58)
The Terrible Secret of Space (5:39)
Nothing Can Stop Torg! (3:32)
The Laziest Man on Mars (3:28)
The Children of Mars (6:16)
Happy Softcore (Bleeding Ears Mix) (3:24)
Superfly's Johnson (Suck It Down) (2:41)
DJ Eat Attack vs. Fat Boys: The Showdown (1:18)
Worst Birthday Ever (1:01)
Secret of Space (Lightworks Tranceform) (9:14)
All Your Dub Are Belong To Us (2:27)
The Terrible Secret of Space (Bit Mix) (5:27)
The Terrible Secret of Space (Spicy Mix) (4:40)
Last Minute Hope (DJnrXic Mix) (3:48)
All Your Treble Are Belong To Us (3:53)
Nothing Can Stop Torg! (K-Systems Mix) (3:30)
All Your Base (Peripheral Mix) (7:07)

The track "We Are Something Awful" is a Laziest Men On Mars song, but was not available on MP3.com at the time of Vivendi's sale of the site to CNET in 2003. It is still available as a free download on some music sites. In addition, they made the song "113 Dead Goons" for the Something Awful Forums.

"The Terrible Secret of Space" is based on an internet meme that originated in an instant message prank run by the editor of the humor website Something Awful, Richard Kyanka.

"Nothing Can Stop Torg" uses lines from the film Santa Claus Conquers the Martians.

"Happy Softcore (Bleeding Ears Mix)" is a remix of the music from stage 5-1, "Attack on the Imperial Castle", in the game Rocket Knight Adventures.

References

External links
"The Laziest Men on Mars" on The Internet Archive

American techno music groups